Ali Kemal Denizci (born 1 March 1950) is a Turkish football manager and former player. A winger, he played for Trabzonspor, Fenerbahçe and Beşiktaş. He was nicknamed Fırtına Kemal (English: Storm Kemal) because of his lightning pace.

Club career
Ali Kemal joined Trabzonspor in 1972 after a couple seasons of playing amateur football. He helped the team get promoted to the Süper Lig for the first time in their history, and was their superstar player when they won their first two Süper Lig titles in the 1975–76, and 1976–77 seasons. In 1978, Trabzonspor had to sell him to cover their revenues and he moved to Fenerbahçe, causing the Trabzonspor fans to riot in the streets. Ali Kemal ended his career with Beşiktaş where he won the 1981–82 1.Lig, and he played his final game in 1983 against his former club Trabzonspor.

International career
Ali Kemal was the first-ever Trabzonspor player to play for the Turkey national team. He made 27 appearances for Turkey, scoring 3 times.

Personal life
Ali Kemal's brother, Osman Denizci, was also a professional footballer in the Süper Lig, who played alongside him in Fenerbahçe.

Honours
Trabzonspor
Süper Lig: 1975–76, 1976–77
Turkish Cup: 1976–77, 1977–78
Turkish Super Cup: 1976, 1977, 1978

Fenerbahçe
Turkish Cup: 1978-1979
TSYD Cup: 1979, 1980, 1981

Beşiktaş
Süper Lig: 1981–1982

References

External links
 
 TFF Manager Profile
 
 Mackolik Manager Profile

1950 births
Living people
Sportspeople from Trabzon
Turkish footballers
Turkey international footballers
Turkish football managers
Trabzonspor footballers
Fenerbahçe S.K. footballers
Beşiktaş J.K. footballers
Süper Lig players
TFF First League players
Kartalspor managers
Kardemir Karabükspor managers
İstanbulspor managers
Hatayspor managers
Boluspor managers
Çaykur Rizespor managers
Trabzonspor managers
Elazığspor managers
Süper Lig managers
Association football wingers